Giannantonio is an Italian masculine blended given name that is a combination of Gianni and Antonio. Notable people known by this name include the following:

Given name
Giannantonio Lecchi or Giovanni Antonio Lecchi (1702 - 1776), Italian Jesuit and mathematician
Giannantonio Moschini (1773 - 1840), Italian author and Roman Catholic priest
Giannantonio Sperotto (born 1950), Italian football player
Giannantonio Orsini, nickname of Giovanni Antonio Del Balzo Orsini (1386 or 1393 – 1463), Italian nobleman and military leader

Surname
Fabio Di Giannantonio (born 1998), Italian motorcycle racer
John Giannantonio (born c. 1934), American gridiron football player

See also

Gian Antonio
Gianantonio

Notes

Italian masculine given names